Posen Township is a civil township of Presque Isle County in the U.S. state of Michigan. The population was 959, at the 2000 census, 65.4% (652) of which reported Polish ancestry.

Communities
Posen is a village located at  along M-65.

Geography

Demographics

As of the census of 2000, 959 people, 387 households, and 260 families resided in the township. There were 463 housing units at an average density of 13.1 per square mile (5.1/km). The racial makeup of the township was 98.12% White, 1.25% African American, and 0.63% from two or more races. Hispanic or Latino of any race were 0.31% of the population. The ancestry make up was 65.4% Polish, 16.9% German, 4.0% American, 3.5% Irish, 3.4% English, 3.3% French, 1.4% French Canadian, 0.9% Norwegian, 0.8% Czech, 0.6% Italian, 0.5% Russian, 0.4% Danish, 0.4% Dutch, 0.3% Swedish, 0.2% Greek, 0.2% Hungarian, 0.2% Scottish, 0.2% Ukrainian.

There were 387 households, out of which 28.9% had children under the age of 18 living with them, 57.9% were married couples living together, 5.7% had a female householder with no husband present, and 32.6% were non-families. 28.9% of all households were made up of individuals, and 15.2% had someone living alone who was 65 years of age or older.  The average household size was 2.45 and the average family size was 3.05.

In the township the population was spread out, with 24.2% under the age of 18, 7.9% from 18 to 24, 25.0% from 25 to 44, 23.6% from 45 to 64, and 19.3% who were 65 years of age or older.  The median age was 40 years. For every 100 females, there were 103.2 males.  For every 100 females age 18 and over, there were 95.4 males.

The median income for a household in the township was $31,912, and the median income for a family was $40,714. Males had a median income of $31,875 versus $23,558 for females. The per capita income for the township was $15,259.  About 4.5% of families and 9.7% of the population were below the poverty line, including 9.9% of those under age 18 and 12.7% of those age 65 or over.

References

Townships in Presque Isle County, Michigan
Polish-American culture in Michigan
Townships in Michigan